Events from the year 1807 in Sweden

Incumbents
 Monarch – Gustav IV Adolf

Events

 January - French occupation of Swedish Pomerania. 
 - The first Steam engine in Sweden is constructed by Samuel Owen.
 - The land reform Enskiftet is enforced in all Sweden-Finland, which signified the end of traditional village life.
 - A reform allows anyone to establish themselves as bakers without a membership in the bakery guild with a permit form the authorities.

Births
 7 February – Charlotta Deland, stage actress (died 1864) 
 14 May – Charlotta Djurström, actress and theater manager  (died 1877)
 22 June - Princess Cecilia of Sweden (1807–1844), princess (died 1844)
 8 August – Emilie Flygare-Carlén, writer (died 1892)
 Sophie Bolander, writer  (died 1869)
 Anna Christina Cronquist, entrepreneur and weaver (died 1893)

Deaths

 - Anna Sophia Holmstedt, ballerina  (born 1759)

References

 
Years of the 19th century in Sweden
Sweden